The 1996 Australian Open was a tennis tournament played on outdoor hard courts at Melbourne Park in Melbourne in Victoria in Australia. It was the 84th edition of the Australian Open and was held from 15 through 28 January 1996.

Jana Novotná and Arantxa Sánchez Vicario were the defending champions, but Novotná did not compete this year.

Sánchez Vicario partnered alongside Chanda Rubin and successfully defended her title, defeating Lindsay Davenport and Mary Joe Fernández 7–5, 2–6, 6–4 in the final. It was the first and only Grand Slam doubles title for Rubin, and the sixth and final Grand Slam doubles title (third and final Australian Open doubles title) for Sánchez Vicario, in their respective careers.

Seeds

Draw

Finals

Top half

Section 1

Section 2

Bottom half

Section 3

Section 4

External links
 1996 Australian Open – Women's draws and results at the International Tennis Federation
 Official Results Archive (Australian Open)

Women's Doubles
Australian Open (tennis) by year – Women's doubles
1996 in Australian women's sport